The Southeastern Indian Artists Association (SEIAA) is an intertribal Native American nonprofit arts organization headquartered in northeastern Oklahoma. 

The group promotes and protects the interests of Native American artists, particularly Southeastern Woodlands. Group members are verified citizens of federally recognized tribes in compliance with the Indian Arts and Crafts Act.

Founding 
Many artists travel to Santa Fe Indian Market, Cherokee Art Market, and various other national Native art events. The group used to operate a cooperative art gallery. Members included Martha Berry, Mike Dart, Bill Glass Jr., Demos Glass, Sharon Irla, Jane Osti, Troy Jackson, and Shan Goshorn. 

The Cherokee Nation provided the CAA a grant to expand their online web gallery. Sharon Irla, CAA Executive Officer says of the group, "These artists preserve our tribal culture and deserve to have their works represented in mainstream media."

Activities 
The SEIAA now promotes artists from any Indigenous people of the Southeastern Woodlands. The organization hosts and promotes groups exhibitions, such as Indigenous Gender Identity (2022). Kindra Swafford (Cherokee Nation) is a member and officer of the organization.

References

External links 
 Official website

2004 establishments in Oklahoma
Native American arts organizations
Native American organizations
Indigenous topics of the Southeastern Woodlands
Art and design-related professional associations